"Permission to Dance" is a song by South Korean boy band BTS. It was released through Big Hit Music and Sony Music on July 9, 2021, as a stand-alone single. The song was also included as part of the CD release of the group's previous single "Butter", and is the band's third English-language single. The song topped the charts in five countries and reached the top ten in ten other territories.

Background and Release

On May 21, 2021, BTS released their second English-language single "Butter" to critical and commercial success. The song was initially released digitally, as a cassette, and as a 7-inch vinyl. On June 15, BTS announced a CD release of "Butter" alongside the announcement for a new song. On June 27, Ed Sheeran revealed in an interview with Most Requested Live that he wrote a song for BTS, stating "I've actually worked with BTS on their last record, and I've just written a song for their new record". On July 1, the group revealed the tracklist for the CD release, announcing the song's title as "Permission to Dance". The song was released on July 9, 2021, alongside its instrumental.

Composition
"Permission to Dance" was written by Ed Sheeran, Johnny McDaid, Steve Mac and Jenna Andrews, with production being handled by Mac and Andrews alongside Stephen Kirk. Sheeran had previously co-written "Make It Right", from BTS's Map of the Soul: Persona (2019).  The song is performed in the key of E major with a tempo of 124 beats per minute in common time with BTS vocals range spanning from C♯4 to t B5. Big Hit initially described that the song "will make your heart beat to the rhythm of BTS's positive energy". It is a upbeat dance-pop track which is accompanied by a powerful string section, bouncy piano lines, and an enticing melody.

Commercial performance 
"Permission to Dance" debuted at number one on the Billboard Hot 100 in the United States, on the issue dated July 24, 2021, earning 15.9 million streams, 1.1 million radio airplay impressions, and selling 140,000 copies in its first week of release. The song replaced "Butter" from the top of the chart, marking the first time an artist had self-replaced themselves since Drake's "In My Feelings" replaced his own "Nice for What" in 2018. The song also became BTS' fifth number-one hit on the chart in ten months and two weeks, making them the artist with the fastest accumulation of five number-one singles since Michael Jackson did so in 1988. Additionally, it became their fourth single to debut atop the Hot 100, extending their record as the group with the most number-one single debuts (tied with Justin Bieber and Drake, but behind Ariana Grande, who has five). On the Digital Songs chart, "Permission to Dance" became BTS' eighth number-one, extending their record as the group with the most number-one hits on the chart. The song debuted atop the Billboard Hot Trending Songs, a chart powered by Twitter which tracks the most-discussed songs on the platform.

In September, Oricon reported that the single had crossed 100 million streams in Japan, becoming BTS' fifth song to do so. This made the band the second male artist to have five songs accumulate as many streams in the country—Official Hige Dandism holds the record with seven.

Reception 
In her 4-star review for NME, Rhian Daly wrote that "Permission to Dance" cemented BTS status as "kings of the feel-good summer smash." She described the song a "classic, uplifting pop" which results in an "undeniable surge of infectious energy."

Accolades 
Unlike with past singles, BTS did not attend any domestic television music programs to promote "Permission to Dance", but still won eight first-place trophies, and achieved a Triple Crown on Inkigayo. The song also won the Melon Popularity Award for five consecutive weeks from July 19 to August 16, 2021.

At the 2021 Nickelodeon Meus Prêmios Nick held on September 28, "Permission to Dance" won the Challenge Hits of the Year award. In 2022, the song won Song of the Year – July at the 11th Gaon Chart Music Awards held on January 27, and Best 5 Songs by Streaming at the 36th Japan Gold Disc Awards in March. In April, it received a nomination for Top Selling Song at the Billboard Music Awards, but eventually lost to "Butter". Its music video was nominated for Best Choreography at the MTV Video Music Awards held in August, but lost to "Woman" by Doja Cat.

Music video
Big Hit released a teaser video, containing a brief excerpt of the song, that showed BTS dancing and having fun outside of a laundromat in the desert, on July 5 at 12AM KST. The official music video was released on July 9 and garnered 72.3 million views on its first day, becoming the sixth-most viewed YouTube video in the first 24 hours at the time.

Synopsis 

Set in a post-pandemic world, the band members are seen dancing in multiple settings including a sunny locale, a laundromat, and a patio. The video's emphasis on service workers echoes the message of BTS's 2018 song "Anpanman," which was inspired by the Japanese picture book hero of the same name and was a promise by the members to give their all in improving the lives of fans; when they debuted their performance, they dressed in the uniforms of firefighters and construction workers, the everyday superheroes who do the same. Similar scenes can be seen in "Permission to Dance," which also features scenes of masked-up employees being welcomed back to work after a year away, a server dancing by herself in a deserted restaurant, a janitor dancing with a teacher in a deserted school hallway, and a mail carrier spotting one of those ubiquitous purple balloons while performing her job. The last 60 seconds of the music video are devoted to the team that works with BTS behind the scenes, and they include a large group of stylists, choreographers, makeup artists, and everyone else who contributes to the creation of music by dancing to the song's choreography with the members.

Promotion 
BTS and YouTube announced the Permission to Dance Challenge, which took place from July 23 to  August 14, exclusively on YouTube Shorts. On September 10, BTS released a new version of the song's music video on the BANGTANTV YouTube Channel. Those who took part in the "Permission to Dance" YouTube Shorts Challenge appeared in the compilation video.  On July 24, the group appeared on SBS evening news program, 8 News for a special interview with news anchor Kim Yong-tae. They also talked about the song on U.S radio stations Sach Zang Show and 102.7 KIIS FM.

Live performances 
BTS shared the first performance of "Permission to Dance," which premiered on the HYBE Label's official Youtube Channel on July 9 for their comeback special A Butterful Getaway with BTS. The setlist also included "Butter" and "Spring Day". The single debuted on television for the first time on the July 13 episode of on The Tonight Show Starring Jimmy Fallon. The septet performed it in the atrium of a shopping mall decorated with thousands of purple balloons as part of the band's "two-day takeover event" for the show. The band made their Radio 1 Live Lounge debut on July 27, performing three songs: "Permission to Dance", "Dynamite" and a cover of Puff Daddy and Faith Evans' 1997 hit "I'll Be Missing You". BTS also performed the song at the 76th United Nations General Assembly on Septembter 20. On September 26, the group gave a special performance of the song at the Global Citizen Live in Seoul. They performed on The Fact Music Awards on October 2. BTS performed the track on November 24, during their appearance on The Late Late Show with James Corden, accompanied by a moving backdrop that included graffiti-covered walls, purple balloons, and flashing lights, marking their first in-person performance on the show since 2020.

Track listing
CD single and digital EP
 "Butter" – 2:44
 "Permission to Dance" – 3:07
 "Butter" (instrumental) – 2:42
 "Permission to Dance" (instrumental) – 3:07

Digital
 "Permission to Dance" – 3:07
 "Permission to Dance" (R&B remix) – 3:36
 "Permission to Dance" (instrumental) – 3:07

Credits and personnel
Credits adapted from Tidal.

 BTS – primary vocals
 Ed Sheeran – songwriting
 Johnny McDaid – songwriting
 Steve Mac – songwriting, production
 Jenna Andrews – songwriting, production, vocal production
 Stephen Kirk – production, vocal production
 Chris Laws – audio engineer
 Dan Pursey – audio engineer
 Juan Pena – audio engineer
 Keith Perry – audio engineer
 Rob Grimaldi – audio engineer
 Pdogg – audio engineer, vocal arrangement
 John Hanes – audio engineer
 Serban Ghenea – mixing engineer
 Chris Gehringer – mastering engineer

Charts

Weekly charts

Monthly charts

Year-end charts

Certifications and sales

Release history

See also
List of Billboard Hot 100 number ones of 2021
List of number-one songs of 2021 (Malaysia)
List of number-one songs of 2021 (Singapore)

References

2021 singles
2021 songs
Billboard Hot 100 number-one singles
BTS songs
English-language South Korean songs
Hybe Corporation singles
Number-one singles in India
Number-one singles in Malaysia
Number-one singles in Singapore
Song recordings produced by Steve Mac
Songs about dancing
Songs written by Ed Sheeran
Songs written by Jenna Andrews
Songs written by Johnny McDaid
Songs written by Steve Mac
Sony Music singles
Billboard Global 200 number-one singles
Billboard Global Excl. U.S. number-one singles